It's Not Rocket Science is a British television show that aired on ITV in 2016. It was presented by Rachel Riley, Ben Miller, and Romesh Ranganathan. The resident scientist was Kevin Fong.

Episodes
The first series aired from 16 February until 22 March 2016. Negative reviews and low ratings resulted in the series not being recommissioned.

References

External links

2016 British television series debuts
2016 British television series endings
English-language television shows
ITV (TV network) original programming
Popular science
Science education in the United Kingdom